This is a list of all the foreign satellites launched by India. India has launched 385 satellites for 34 different countries as of 26 November 2022. As of 2019, the  Indian Space Research Organisation, India's government space agency, is the only launch-capable agency in India, and launches all research and commercial projects.

Commercial launches for foreign nations are negotiated through NSIL (formerly through Antrix), the ISRO's commercial arm. Between 2013 and 2015, India launched 28 foreign satellites for nine different countries, earning a total revenue of US$101 million.

As of October 2022, the Polar Satellite Launch Vehicle and GSLV Mk III are the launch vehicles utilized for international commercial launches. The GSLV Mk II has yet to receive commercial orders. In addition, the Small Satellite Launch Vehicle is currently in development for international commercial launches of small satellites.

On 15 February 2017, ISRO launched 104 satellites on single launch by a PSLV-XL. 96 of them were from the United States, while the others were from Israel, the UAE, Kazakhstan, the Netherlands, Belgium and Germany. It was the largest number of satellites launched on a single flight by any space agency (with the previous record held by Russia's Dnepr launcher, which launched 37 in June 2014) until 24 January 2021, when SpaceX launched the Transporter-1 mission on a Falcon 9 rocket carrying 143 satellites into orbit.

1990s

2000s

2010s

2020s

Satellites launched from India by country

See also 
 List of Indian satellites
 Space industry of India

References

External links 

International customer satellite launches - Antrix
List of International Customer Satellites Launched by PSLV - ISRO

Lists of satellites
Space programme of India
India science and technology-related lists
Foreign relations of India
Indian Space Research Organisation